Mohammad-Ali Ala ol-Saltaneh ( ‎; 1829 – June 23, 1918 in Tehran), was a Persian Prime Minister of Qajar era Iran. He served as Prime Minister of Iran twice.

1829 births
1918 deaths
Prime Ministers of Iran
Politics of Qajar Iran
People from Baghdad
Ambassadors of Iran to the United Kingdom
Foreign ministers of Iran
19th-century Iranian politicians
20th-century Iranian politicians
People of Qajar Iran

References